Forks of Cypress Cemetery (also known as Jackson Cemetery) is a historic cemetery near Florence, Alabama.  The cemetery contains the graves of Forks of Cypress owner James Jackson, several members of his family, and numerous slaves who worked on the plantation.  Jackson, an immigrant from County Monaghan, Ireland, purchased the estate in 1818 and built the main house in 1830.  The cemetery was established soon after the estate; the oldest interment, dating from 1819, is William Augustus Moore, a relative of Jackson's wife, Sally.

The cemetery is situated on 5 acres (2 ha) about 1000 feet (300 m) from the site of the main house.  It is divided into the Jackson family plot, which is surrounded by a 4-foot (1.2-meter) tall stone wall, and the African-American section which contains graves of slaves who worked the plantation and later tenant farmers.  Antebellum markers are the most elaborate, showing influences from popular residential architectural styles such as Greek Revival and Classical Revival.  Most were made of grey limestone or marble and were variations of obelisks.  Later monuments are primarily of granite, and are smaller, in deference either architecturally to the more elaborate markers that preceded them, or to the ancestral founders of the family.  Two African-American slave jockeys are buried inside the family plot wall, showing the importance to Jackson of his stable of race horses.  The slave cemetery is the resting place of over 250 of the plantation's workers, as well as many of their free descendants.  The graves, mostly unmarked, represents one of the largest African-American cemeteries in the region.  Author Alex Haley's great-grandmother, Ester, is buried in the cemetery.

The cemetery was listed on the National Register of Historic Places in 2000.

References

External links

 

National Register of Historic Places in Lauderdale County, Alabama
Cemeteries on the National Register of Historic Places in Alabama
Buildings and structures in Florence, Alabama
1819 establishments in Alabama
Cemeteries established in the 1810s
Burial grounds of the African diaspora in the Western hemisphere